Frederick Anthony Parnell (January 9, 1901 – May 29, 1982) was an American football player who played four seasons with the New York Giants of the National Football League. He first enrolled at Colgate University before transferring to Allegheny College. He attended Ashtabula High School in Ashtabula, Ohio. He was a member of the New York Giants team that won the 1927 NFL Championship.

References

External links
Just Sports Stats

1901 births
1982 deaths
Players of American football from Ohio
American football tackles
American football guards
Colgate Raiders football players
Allegheny Gators football players
New York Giants players
Brooklyn Lions players
Sportspeople from Ashtabula, Ohio